The Bishopric of Utrecht was an ecclesiastical principality of the Holy Roman Empire in the Low Countries, in the present-day Netherlands. From 1024 to 1528, as one of the prince-bishoprics of the Holy Roman Empire, it was ruled by the bishops of Utrecht. The Prince-Bishopric of Utrecht must not be confused with the Diocese of Utrecht, which extended beyond the Prince-Bishopric and over which the bishop exercised spiritual authority.

In 1528, Charles V, secularized the Prince-Bishopric, depriving the bishop of its secular authority.

History

Foundation 
The Diocese of Utrecht was established in 695 when Saint Willibrord was consecrated bishop of the Frisians at Rome by Pope Sergius I. With the consent of the Frankish ruler, Pippin of Herstal, he settled in an old Roman fort in  Utrecht. After Willibrord's death the diocese suffered greatly from the incursions of the Frisians, and later on of the Vikings. Whether Willibrord could be called the first bishop of Utrecht is doubtful; as James Palmer points out, "there was no real concept of a well-defined bishopric until at least the days of Alberic (775–84)". And while Saint Boniface is referred to in his hagiographies as the successor of Willibrord (and, in turn, Gregory of Utrecht is referred to as the successor to Willibrord and Boniface), this does not necessarily mean "successor as bishop", but rather that they succeeded each other as missionaries to the Frisians.

Prince-Bishopric of Utrecht 
Better times appeared during the reign of the Saxon emperors, who frequently summoned the Bishops of Utrecht to attend the imperial councils and diets. In 1024 the bishops were made Princes of the Holy Roman Empire and the new Prince-Bishopric of Utrecht was formed.  The secular territory over which it ruled was known as Sticht Utrecht or Het Sticht (a sticht was any piece of land governed by a bishop or abbot).  This territory was divided into the Nedersticht (Lower Sticht, roughly corresponding to the present day province of Utrecht) and Oversticht (Upper Sticht, encompassing the present-day provinces of Overijssel, Drenthe, and part of Groningen).

In 1122, with the Concordat of Worms, the Emperor's right of investiture was annulled, and the cathedral chapter received the right to elect the bishop. It was, however, soon obligated to share this right with the four other collegiate chapters in the city. The Counts of Holland and Guelders, between whose territories the lands of the Bishops of Utrecht lay, also sought to acquire influence over the filling of the episcopal see. This often led to disputes and consequently the Holy See frequently interfered in the election. After the middle of the 14th century the popes repeatedly appointed the bishop directly without regard to the five chapters.

It was part of the Lower Rhenish–Westphalian Circle

In 1527, the Bishop sold his territories, and thus his secular authority, to Holy Roman Emperor Charles V and the principality became an integral part of the Habsburg dominions. The chapters transferred their right of electing the bishop to Charles V and his government, a measure to which Pope Clement VII gave his consent, under political pressure after the Sack of Rome.

End 

The Prince-Bishopric of Utrecht was conquered by Habsburg troops in 1528. The southwestern Nedersticht core territory around the city of Utrecht became the Lordship of Utrecht, whilst the southern part of the Oversticht was transformed into the Lordship of Overijssel. The northern parts were annexed in 1536 as the County of Drenthe.

Prince-bishops

Adalbold II     (1010–1026)
Bernold                           (1026/7–1054)
William I (1054–1076)
Conrad       (1076–1099)
Burchard   (1100–1112)
Godbald                          (1114–1127)
Andreas van Cuijk                 (1127/8–1139)
Hartbert                          (1139–1150)
Herman van Horne                  (1151–1156)
Godfrey van Rhenen               (1156–1178)
Baldwin II van Holland          (1178–1196)
Arnold I van Isenburg             (1196–1197)
Dirk I van Holland (1197)
Dirk II van Are (van Ahr)         (1197/8–1212)
Otto I van Gelre                  (1212–1215)
Otto II van Lippe                 (1216–1227)
Wilbrand van Oldenburg            (1227–1233)
Otto III van Holland              (1233–1249)
Gozewijn van Amstel (van Randerath) (1249–1250)
Henry I van Vianden             (1250/2–1267)
John I of Nassau                  (1267–1290)
John II van Sierck                 (1290–1296)
Willem II Berthout                (1296–1301)
Guy van Avennes                   (1301–1317)
Frederik II van Sierck            (1317–1322)
Jacob van Oudshoorn               (1322)
Jan III van Diest                 (1322–1340)
Jan IV van Arkel (1342–1364)
Jan V van Virneburg               (1364–1371)
Arnold II of Horne               (1371–1379)
Floris van Wevelinkhoven          (1379–1393)
Frederik III van Blankenheim      (1393–1423)
Rudolf van Diepholt               (1423–1455)
Zweder van Culemborg              (1425–1433)
Walraven van Meurs                (1434–1448)
Gijsbrecht van Brederode          (1455–1456)
David of Burgundy                 (1456–1496)
Frederick IV of Baden             (1496–1517)
Philip of Burgundy (1517–1524)
Henry of the Palatinate             (1524–1529)

Notes

References

Further reading

External links
 Apostolisch vicarissen van de Hollandse Zending 

Utrecht (city)
Medieval Netherlands
Prince-Bishopric of Utrecht
History of Utrecht (city)
States and territories established in 1024
States and territories disestablished in 1528
Former polities in the Netherlands

Prince-bishoprics of the Holy Roman Empire in the Netherlands
Lower Rhenish-Westphalian Circle
Prince-Bishopric of Utrecht
Prince-Bishopric of Utrecht
2nd millennium in the Netherlands